The Raviz Kollam, also known as The Raviz Ashtamudi, is a five-star hotel on the banks of the Ashtamudi lake in the city of Kollam, India. The hotel is owned by the Raviz Hotels & Resorts company and was designed by the noted Indian architect Eugene Pandala, known for his commitment to environmental sustainability. The Raviz has the usual characteristics of a five-star hotel, including many rooms, suites, private swimming pools, etc. Actors Shahrukh Khan and Mohanlal inaugurated the hotel on 19 August 2011.

Gallery

See also
 Kollam
 Islands of Kollam

References

External links

Buildings and structures in Kollam
Hotel buildings completed in 2011
Hotels in Kerala
2011 establishments in Kerala